Robin Kovacs (born 16 November 1996) is a Swedish professional ice hockey forward for Lausanne HC of the Swiss National League (NL). He was drafted 62nd overall by the New York Rangers in the 2015 NHL Entry Draft.

Playing career
He made his Elitserien debut playing with AIK during the 2012–13 Elitserien season. Kovacs, who is of Hungarian descent, was seen as one of the top twenty international skaters for the 2015 NHL Entry Draft according to the NHL Central Scouting Bureau.

Kovacs played in four games with Rögle BK in the Swedish Hockey League (SHL) during the 2015–16 season. After being loaned for the majority of the campaign back with AIK, Kovacs signed a three-year, entry-level contract with the New York Rangers on 18 July 2016.

In his first North American season in 2016–17, Kovacs struggled to adapt offensively in playing with the Rangers American Hockey League affiliate, the Hartford Wolf Pack. He appeared in 72 of 76 games with the Wolf Pack totalling just 2 goals and 12 points. Having endured a troubling off-season in Sweden (see Personal life), and under performing in at the Rangers 2017 training camp, Kovacs failed to play in a pre-season game as he was amongst the first roster cuts reassigned to Hartford on 19 September 2017. On 1 October 2017, Kovacs was placed on unconditional waivers in order to terminate the remainder of his contract with the Rangers and return to Sweden. On 7 October 2017, he signed a two-year deal with Luleå HF of the Swedish Hockey League (SHL). In April 2022 he signed a tree-year contract with Lausanne HC in Switzerland.

Personal life
Kovacs has a neuropsychiatric disability, with ADHD and dyslexia. He has credited the conditions in helping progress his professional career.

Kovacs was found guilty and later fined for reckless driving in a fatal traffic accident involving a friend, in June 2017.

He and his partner, retired Swedish national team goaltender Minatsu Murase, have three children  – born in October 2018, September 2020, and November 2022.

Career statistics

Regular season and playoffs

International

References

External links

1996 births
AIK IF players
Hartford Wolf Pack players
Lausanne HC players
Living people
Luleå HF players
New York Rangers draft picks
Rögle BK players
Swedish ice hockey right wingers
Ice hockey people from Stockholm